Eacles is a genus of moths in the family Saturniidae. They are native to the Americas. The genus was erected by Jacob Hübner in 1819.

Species
The genus includes the following species:

Eacles acuta Schaus, 1905
Eacles adoxa Jordan, 1910
Eacles barnesi Schaus, 1905
Eacles bertrandi Lemaire, 1981
Eacles callopteris W. Rothschild, 1907
Eacles camposportoi Mendes, 1937
Eacles canaima Feige, 1971
Eacles cuscoensis Brechlin & Meister, 2009
Eacles ducalis Walker, 1855
Eacles fairchildi May & Oiticica, 1941
Eacles guianensis Schaus, 1905
Eacles imperialis (Drury, 1773)
Eacles kaechi (Brechlin & Meister, 2011)
Eacles lauroi Oiticica, 1938
Eacles lemairei Rego Barros & Tangerini, 1973
Eacles magnifica Walker, 1855
Eacles manuelita Oiticica, 1941
Eacles masoni Schaus, 1896
Eacles mayi Schaus, 1920
Eacles ormondei Schaus, 1889
Eacles oslari Rothschild, 1907
Eacles paraadoxa Brechlin & Meister, 2009
Eacles penelope (Cramer, 1775)
Eacles silkae (Brechlin & Meister, 2011)

Gallery

References

Ceratocampinae